Richard Reeves may refer to:

Richard Reeves (actor) (1912–1967), American character actor
Richard Reeves (animator) (born 1959), abstract filmmaker
Richard Reeves (American writer) (1936–2020), writer, syndicated columnist and lecturer at the Annenberg School for Communication
Richard Reeves (New Zealand politician) (1836–1910), New Zealand politician for the Liberal Party
Richard V. Reeves (British author) (born 1969), British writer and Special Adviser to UK Deputy Prime Minister Nick Clegg
Richard Ambrose Reeves (1899–1980), priest and opponent of apartheid
Richard Stone Reeves (1919–2005), equine painter

See also
Richard Reeve (fl. 1640–1680), English instrument maker